Cheri Knight is an American singer, songwriter, and bassist known for her albums (solo and with the band Blood Oranges).

Early music career
After performing in various Northampton-area bands, Cheri Knight was the singer, songwriter and bass player with the alternative country band Blood Oranges.

Solo music career
When East Side Digital Records folded, the Blood Oranges amicably disbanded. Cheri then recorded two solo albums during her active music career.

The Knitter (1996) was produced by Eric "Roscoe" Ambel, and released on East Side Digital Records. Artists involved included guitarist Eric Ambel (The Del-Lords), bassist Ray Mason, drummer Will Rigby (The dB's), guitarist Mark Spencer, Andy York (bass).

The Northeast Kingdom (1998) was produced by the Twangtrust (Steve Earle and Ray Kennedy) and released on E-Squared Records. Musicians include Steve Earle, Emmylou Harris (vocals), Tammy Rogers (fiddle), Jimmy Ryan (mandolin), Mark Spencer (guitar), and Will Rigby (drums).

Post-music career
There has always been a strong link between gardening and Cheri's music. When not performing music, Cheri tended an organic farm in Massachusetts.

Since the release of The Northeast Kingdom, Cheri has focused on flower farming, and has rarely recorded or performed.

Discography

Albums
 1996: The Knitter (East Side Digital)
 1998: The Northeast Kingdom (E-Squared)
 2022: American Rituals (Freedom To Spend)

Compilations
1996: Various Artists – Rig Rock Deluxe (A Musical Salute to the American Truck Driver) (Upstart Sounds) – track 9, "Wagon Of Clay"
 1999: Various Artists – It's Heartbreak That Sells: A Tribute To Ray Mason (Targa Records), track 4, "Down In The Night"

Appears on
 1996: Kevin Salem – Glimmer (Roadrunner Records) – background vocals on track 6, "Sleep" and track 8, "All On Trial"
 1998: Ray Mason – Old Souls Day (Wormco Records) – background vocals
 1996: Ray Mason – Missyouville (Ocean Records) – background vocals
 1996: Wooden Leg – Wooden Leg (East Side Digital Records)

With The Blood Oranges
See Blood Oranges discography

References

External links
 
 
 
 
 

Year of birth missing (living people)
Living people
American bass guitarists
Women bass guitarists